The Torneo del Interior A is an annual rugby union competition in Argentina. The competition involves clubs from all provincial unions outside Buenos Aires. Teams qualify from different tournaments along the provinces of Argentina, such as Litoral, Noroeste, Córdoba, Nordeste, Pampeano, Oeste and Patagónico.

There are also two lower divisions of Torneo del Interior, "Interior B" and "Interior C", with a similar format.

Overview
The original tournament was held from 1998 to 2004, being re-launched in 2009, in an effort to bring provincial clubs to the same level as the teams from Buenos Aires.

Buenos Aires clubs do not participate in this competition so they take part in the Top 12 organised by the URBA. From 2013 on, the top nine teams from the Torneo del Interior qualify for the Nacional de Clubes, where they compete with the top seven teams from the Torneo de la URBA.

Format
The "Torneo del Interior A" is contested by 16 clubs from the best placed teams of predetermined seven regional tournaments. Teams are divided into four zones, playing each other in a double round-robin tournament. Teams with the most points in each zone advance to quarter finals, concluding with semi-finals and a final.

In 2018, Uruguayan club Montevideo Cricket took part of the tournament by invitation.

Championships
Below is the list of finals contested from 1998 to date:

Finals

Notes

Titles by team

References

External links
 

Rugby union competitions in Argentina
1998 establishments in Argentina